The 2007–08 CEV Challenge Cup was the 28th edition of the European Challenge Cup volleyball club tournament, the former CEV Cup.

The Italian club Cimone Modena beat the Russian club Lokomotiv Ekaterinburg in the final and achieved its fifth CEV Challenge Cup trophy.

Final Four
Venue: Hala Podpromie,  Rzeszów

Semi finals

|}

3rd place

|}

Final

|}

Final standing

Awards

Most Valuable Player
  André Nascimento (Cimone Modena)
Best Scorer
  André Nascimento (Cimone Modena)
Best Opposite
  Paweł Papke (Asseco Resovia)
Best Blocker
  André Heller (Cimone Modena) 

Best Receiver
  José Luis Lobato (Stade Poitevin Poitiers)
Best Setter
  Denis Ignatyev (Lokomotiv Ekaterinburg)
Best Server
  Ángel Dennis (Cimone Modena)

References

External links
 Official site

CEV Challenge Cup
2007 in volleyball
2008 in volleyball